Sundre/Goodwins Farm Airport  is located  south of Sundre, Alberta, Canada.

See also
Sundre Airport

References

External links
Place to Fly on COPA's Places to Fly airport directory

Registered aerodromes in Alberta
Mountain View County